Makaokaha'i Point is a jutting headland on the south coast of the island of Kauai in the Hawaiian Islands.

Headlands of Kauai